The Sangre de Cristo Range is a mountain range of the Rocky Mountains in southern Colorado in the United States, running north and south along the east side of the Rio Grande Rift.

According to the USGS, the range is the northern part of the larger Sangre de Cristo Mountains, which extend through northern New Mexico. 
Usage of the terms "Sangre de Cristo Range" and "Sangre de Cristo Mountains" is varied; however, this article discusses only the mountains between Poncha Pass and La Veta Pass.

Notable peaks
A 14er is a mountain peak that has an elevation of at least 14,000 feet. Colorado has 53, the most of any state. There are 10 14ers in the Sangre de Cristo Range, which can be seen in the table below.

Geography

The Sangre de Cristo Mountains run from Poncha Pass in Central Colorado to Glorieta Pass near Santa Fe, New Mexico. Most of the range is shared by two National Forests, which abut along the range divide. Most of the northeast (Arkansas River) side is located within the San Isabel National Forest, while most of the southwest (San Luis Valley) side is included in the Rio Grande National Forest. The central part of the range is designated as the Sangre de Cristo Wilderness. The Great Sand Dunes National Park and Preserve sits on the southwestern flank of the range at the edge of the San Luis Valley. The range divide is traversed by no paved roads, only by four-wheel drive and foot trails over Hayden Pass, Hermit Pass, Music Pass, Medano Pass, and Mosca Pass.

Other well-known peaks are the fourteeners of the Crestone group: Kit Carson Mountain, Crestone Peak, Crestone Needle, and Humboldt Peak. Two sub-peaks of Kit Carson Mountain, Challenger Point and Columbia Point, are named in memory of the crews of the Space Shuttle Challenger and the Space Shuttle Columbia.
The range is also home to many high peaks in the 13,000 to 14,000 foot (3,900-4,300 m) range as it continues into New Mexico. In New Mexico most of the mountain area is managed by the US Forest Service in the Carson and Santa Fe National Forests.

Geology
The Colorado Sangre de Cristos are fault-block mountains similar to the Teton Range in Wyoming and the Wasatch Range in Utah. Major fault lines run along the east and west sides of the range, and cut right through the mountains in some places. Like all fault-block mountain ranges, the Sangre de Cristos lack foothills which means the highest peaks rise abruptly from the valleys to the east and west, rising  in only a few miles in some places. The mountains were pushed up around 5 million years ago, basically as one large mass of rock. The Sangre de Cristo range is still being uplifted today as faults in the area remain active. Due to uplift (elevation increase) and erosion, rock layers are missing, causing gaps in the range, called "unconformities."

On the west side is the San Luis Valley, a portion of the Rio Grande Rift. On the southeast side is the Raton Basin, a quiet but still active volcanic field.  On the northeast side are the Wet Mountains and the Front Range, areas of Precambrian igneous and metamorphic rocks formed during the Colorado orogeny some 1.7 billion years ago and then uplifted more recently during the Laramide orogeny.

The Blanca Massif is also Precambrian rock, while most of the rest of the Sangres is composed of younger Permian-Pennsylvanian (about 250-million-year-old) rock, a mix of sedimentary conglomerates, silty mudstones and shales, sandstones, limestone beds  and igneous intrusions.  These sedimentary rocks originated as sediment eroded from the Ancestral Rocky Mountains. Crestone Conglomerate are a feature on many of the peaks, including Crestone Needle. The conglomerate settled near the uplift and contains boulders as large as 6 feet in diameter.

Climate

History
Antonio Valverde y Cosio named the Sangre de Cristo range after the red-hue that he saw during the snowy sunrise. Sangre de Cristo means Blood of Christ in English.

In the formation of the range, we can see fossils of footprints, shells and bones.

In August 2009, the Sangre de Cristo Range was dedicated as a National Heritage Area (NHA), an area of cultural, natural, and historic preservation.

Economy 
Today, tourism is the main economic activity.

See also

Southern Rocky Mountains
Mountain ranges of Colorado

References

Notes

External links

Sangre de Cristo Range @ Peakbagger
Table listing of all the thirteeners in Sangre de Cristo @ Pikes Peak Photo
High resolution zoomable panorama of the Sangre de Cristo mountain range looking West
CO & NM Sangre de Cristo Mountains

Mountain ranges of Colorado
Sangre de Cristo Mountains
Ranges of the Rocky Mountains
Landforms of Custer County, Colorado
Landforms of Saguache County, Colorado
San Luis Valley of Colorado
Sangre de Cristo National Heritage Area